Pablo José López Jiménez (born in Málaga, Spain on 11 March 1984) is a Spanish singer and musician. He sings mostly melodic pop and pop rock songs. He also plays piano and guitar. He is signed to Universal Music Group.

He started his musical career in the pop band Niño Raro with reggae, Latin and rock influences. It was formed in 2007 and made up of Pablo López and his friends Juanjo Martín and Antonio Carlos Miñan. Rap was added with Félix Sánchez joining, and finally electric, acoustic elements with Cuban musician Yohany Suárez. The band released the album Trentaytrés but was soon dissolved.

In 2008, López became more famous after taking part in 2008 in Operación Triunfo the Spanish version of Star Academy and finishing as runner-up.

His debut single was "Vi" taken from his debut album Once historias y un piano. The album was certified gold in Spain. The follow-up album El Mundo y los Amantes Inocentes in 2015 became a bigger hit and certified double platinum. His vocals were featured in the soundtrack of the Spanish TV series El Príncipe and the title track "El Mundo" peaked at number 12 on the Productores de Música de España official singles chart. López was nominated for Best Contemporary Pop Vocal Album at the 17th Latin Grammy Awards for El Mundo y los Amantes Inocentes.

López has been a coach on La Voz, La Voz Kids, & La Voz Senior. He is the only Spanish coach that has won all three versions of the show.

Discography

Albums
Studio

Live

Others
2014: Once Historias y un Piano. Edición Especial

Singles 

Others
2013: "Dónde"
2014: "Suplicando"
2016: "Lo Saben Mis Zapatos"

Soundtracks

References

External links
Official website

1984 births
Living people
People from Málaga
Operación Triunfo contestants
21st-century Spanish singers
21st-century Spanish male singers